Hamidreza Moghaddamfar (born 1961) is an Iranian university professor, expert on strategic issues, cultural and media adviser to the commander of the Islamic Revolutionary Guard Corps of Iran, deputy of the Office of Preservation and Publication of Seyyed Ali Khamenei's Works, secretary of the People's Headquarters of Commemoration of Qassem Soleimani and cultural adviser of the Islamic Azad University. He is in charge of publishing and advertising the works of Seyyed Ali Khamenei (the current leader of Iran) to the youth of Europe and North America. He was the CEO of Fars News Agency from 2007 to 2011. Then, he became the cultural and social deputy of the Islamic Revolution Guards Corps (IRGC) and was in this position until September 2014. In 2015, Moghadamfar received the official Iran honorary badge of The Striving in the Field of Culture and Art. He is also a member of the board of trustees of the shrine of Sultan Ali ibn Muhammad Baqir.

Hamidreza Moghaddamfar also has a record of being a member of the Islamic Republican Party, teaching and managing in the Iran's education ministry branches.

Communication with Catherine Perez-Shakdam 
In March 2022, materials were published on social networks that Hamidreza Moghaddamfar, the deputy of the Office of Preservation and Publication of Seyyed Ali Khamenei's Works, met with Catherine Perez-Shakdam, and connected her to institutions and organizations such as Ali Khamenei's office and Tasnim news agency. The Tasnim news agency published a statement on its website, denying this meeting and calling it a lie by some supporters of Mahmoud Ahmadinejad, the former president of Iran. So Tasnim news agency totally denied the responsibility of Hamidreza Moghaddamfar in Ali Khamenei's office.

The Persian-language section of the Independent newspaper wrote in a report that Catherine Perez-Shakdam, who previously worked in think tanks affiliated with the Israeli government, entered Iran and won the trust of many senior officials and IRGC commanders, so she had close cooperation with the Office of Preservation and Publication of the Works of the Leader of the Islamic Republic of Iran under supervision of Hamidreza Moghaddamfar and Komeil Khojasteh Bagherzadeh, the nephew of Ali Khamenei's wife.

Violation of the rights of Baha'i citizens 

Hamidreza Moghaddamfar has been criticized for publishing anti-Bahá'í contents in Fars news agency during his tenure as CEO.

See also
 Nasrollah Khadem
 Ezzatollah Zarghami
 Isa Kalantari
 Mostafa Ajorlu
 Sohrab Gilani

References

External links
 
 Hamidreza Moghaddamfar: Rouhani Pushes Back against Security Media
 Presenting a strategic model of "the evolution of the Islamic Revolution" by Hamidreza Moghaddamfar

Iranian academics
Islamic Republican Party politicians
Living people
Iranian mass media people
1961 births
Islamic Revolutionary Guard Corps second brigadier generals
Iranian chief executives